Yuri van Gelder (born 20 April 1983) is a Dutch gymnast, whose best discipline is the rings. His nickname is "Lord of the Rings".

Career
Born in Waalwijk, Netherlands, Van Gelder took the gold in the men's rings at the 2005 European Championships held in Debrecen, Hungary. He became world champion in the same discipline at the 2005 World Artistic Gymnastics Championships in Melbourne, Australia. He won bronze at the 2006 World Artistic Gymnastics Championships in Aarhus, Denmark. At the 2007 World Artistic Gymnastics Championships in Stuttgart, Germany, he won a silver medal.

Suspension
On July 13, 2009, he revealed that he used cocaine three days before the Dutch championships in Rotterdam. Van Gelder said he very much regretted his "lapse" and called himself "incredibly stupid". He has since had to return his national championship gold medal, and was suspended by the Dutch Gymnastics Union. IOC regulations implied that because of the suspension he would not be admitted to the Olympic Games in 2012. He was also fired from his job with the Dutch military, as they have a 'zero tolerance' drugs policy.

He was pulled out of the 2010 Worlds a few days before start, with the team citing personal medical reasons and refusing to answer questions about drugs.

In 2011, there was an appeal, by LaShawn Merritt, at the CAS against the general rule that after a suspension the athlete is not allowed to participate in the next Olympic Games. The appeal was granted and thereby Van Gelder still had a chance to qualify. For this, he had to achieve a good result at the 2011 World Artistic Gymnastics Championships, but he was unsuccessful.

2016 Olympic Games

At the 2016 Summer Olympics, he reached the finals on rings. On August 8, 2016 (one week before the finals), he was dismissed from the Dutch team as a disciplinary measure, because against team rules he had not returned to the Olympic Village until early the next morning after consuming alcohol off-premises. As a variation on his nickname "lord of the rings", the Dutch media immediately referred to Van Gelder as "lord of the drinks". A request of a preliminary injunction requiring that the National Olympic Committee would attempt to reinstate Van Gelder's position in the finals was rejected.

References

External links
 
 

1983 births
Living people
Dutch male artistic gymnasts
World champion gymnasts
Medalists at the World Artistic Gymnastics Championships
European champions in gymnastics
People from Waalwijk
Doping cases in gymnastics
Dutch sportspeople in doping cases
Gymnasts at the 2016 Summer Olympics
Olympic gymnasts of the Netherlands
Sportspeople from North Brabant
20th-century Dutch people
21st-century Dutch people